Triveni Devi Bhalotia College, also known as Raniganj TDB College, This institution is co-educational and has the morning and day sections, established in 1957, is a college at Raniganj, in Asansol, Paschim Bardhaman district, West Bengal, India. It is situated in a central location of Raniganj between NH-2 and Eastern Railway. It offers undergraduate courses in arts, commerce and sciences and post graduate courses. It is the second biggest college in West Bengal with respect to higher education with 37 Honours subjects and 7 Postgraduate subjects. Recently, the college has celebrated its Golden Jubilee in 2007.

Affiliation and Accreditation 
Triveni Devi Bhalotia College (TDB College) initiated its journey from 1957 as an affiliated college under the University of Calcutta. From 1960, affiliated to The University of Burdwan and on 24 June 2015, is affiliated to  Kazi Nazrul University, Asansol. and is recognized by the University Grants Commission (UGC).

Campus 
The college campus consists of college building, central library, residential staff quarters, boy's hostels and three play grounds which covers an area of 15 acres(approximate). Among which the main college campus along with the branch of a Syndicate Bank covers the 40 percent and 20 percent land is used for garden and plants.

Departments

Undergraduate Science

Biochemistry
Botany
Chemistry
Computer Application
Computer Science
Economics
Electronics
Environmental Science
Geography
Geology
Mathematics
Nutrition
Physics
Physiology
Psychology
Statistics
Zoology

Undergraduate Arts

Bengali
Education
English
Hindi
Hindustani Music
History
Multimedia and Mass Communications
Philosophy
Physical Education
Political Science
Sanskrit
Santali
Sociology
Urdu

Undergraduate Commerce

Accountancy
Business Administration
Finance
Taxation

Postgraduate Science

Chemistry
Zoology
Geography

Postgraduate Arts

Bengali
English
Hindi
Urdu

Library 
The college owes a separate central Library Building designed to cater to the college's current and future teaching and research interests. The primary mission of the library is to support the educational program of the college by providing access to rich physical and digital repositories of learning resources. It has a very rich and unique collection of approximately 85000 books, ancient manuscripts, periodicals, magazines and journals for reading, referencing or borrowing. There are reading and lending facilities in the library. There are individual libraries in the department which the students can access at the discretion of the departmental faculty. The INFLIBNET facility allows the students to have easy access in browsing and for reference work. The library also provides a quiet and peaceful reading room that is conducive for learning and referencing. With the vast stock of old and rare books as well as the growing maintenance demands, plans for further infrastructural developments and expansion are underway.

Hostel 
Hallmark of a good institution is its ability to provide excellent amenities beside quality education. Our institutionprovides hostel facilities for the boys. The boys' hostel building is constructed at the north eastern corner of the college campus accommodating 100 boys. All the amenities are well provided for the healthy living condition that provides confidence in favour of learning.

Open-Air Theatre 
The open-air theatre - "Binoy Chowdhury Mancha" - is meant for organizing cultural programs, annual functions, reunions of Departments and other programs; in which group gathering may be required. The open-air theatre has the capacity to accommodate around 2000 spectators comfortably at a time.

Career Guidance Cell 
The career Guidance Cell at TDB college functions under the direct control and direction of the Principal of the college. A team of professors work together to guide the students on various career opportunities. The objective of the cell is to identify the talents available among the students of this college and nurture and harness them further; offering guidance to choose a bright and right career.
The activities of the cell include collecting the database of the students and compiling them for use, when needed. The cell guides the students and improves their skill to face various competitive exams an interviews. The career guidance cell organizes seminars and meetings to encourage the students to plan their future. The cell invites reputed companies to the campus to conduct campus interview and find suitable jobs for the skill available among the students. Conduct campus interview and find suitable to be further. The cell also facilitates the economically weaker sections of the students of first and second year undergraduate courses to find suitable part-time jobs to supplement the family income without affecting the academic pursuit.

Other Facilities 
National Cadet Corps (NCC)
National Service Scheme (NSS)
Govt. Scholarship for SC/ST Students
Students Aid Fund
Free Studentship
Students Union
Annual Sports
NTA-UGC NET/ SET Coaching Centre
Psychological Counselling Cell
E-Learning Portal
Grievance and Redressal Cell (for COVID-19)

Alumni Association 
The college has an alumni association named TDB College Alumni Association (TDBCAA). TDBCAA was established on 7 July 2007 with an aim to create opportunities to create and maintain contacts with the alumnus. Among other activities of TDBCAA, it provides scholarship to the needy students and grants Certificate of Merit to the top three positions of college in University of Burdwan.

Recent Activities
The college has the privilege to host the First Women's Athletic Meet (for both UG and PG) organized by the Kazi Nazrul University in Feb 2016. The took pride for being the champions in the Women's Badminton District Meet-2017. In 2018, this college also organised the games and sports championship of KNU, Asansol. In 2018, this college also organised the District-level Inter-College Games and Sports meet, sponsored by DPI, (Higher Education) Govt. of W.B. TDB College took the pride privilege to host the first "District Environment Fair-2019" of Paschim Bardhaman, sponsored by the office of the District Magistrate and Collectorate, (Govt. of W.B.).

See also

References

External links
Triveni Devi Bhalotia College
Kazi Nazrul University
University Grants Commission
National Assessment and Accreditation Council

Universities and colleges in Paschim Bardhaman district
Colleges affiliated to Kazi Nazrul University
Education in Asansol
Educational institutions established in 1957
1957 establishments in West Bengal